The 2007 Chatham Cup was the 80th annual nationwide knockout football competition in New Zealand.

Up to the last 16 of the competition, the cup was run in three regions (northern, central, and southern), with an open draw from the quarter-finals on. In all, 123 teams took part in the competition. Note: Different sources give different numberings for the rounds of the competition. Some record five rounds prior to the quarter-finals; others note a preliminary round followed by four full rounds. The former numbering system is used in this article.

The 2007 final

The Jack Batty Memorial Cup, presented to the player adjudged to have made to most positive impact in the Chatham Cup final, was awarded to Luiz del Monte of Central United.

Results

Third Round

* Won on penalties by Glenfield Rovers (4-2), Metro (3-1), and Nelson Suburbs (5-4).

Fourth Round

* Won on penalties by Nomads United (3-0) and Papakura City (6-5).

Fifth Round

* Won on penalties by Central United (4-3).

Quarter-finals

Semi-finals

Final

* Won on penalties by Central United (10-9).

References

Rec.Sport.Soccer Statistics Foundation New Zealand 2007 page
Ultimatenzsoccer.com 2007 Chatham Cup page

Chatham Cup
Chatham Cup
Chatham Cup
Chat